The 2005 Individual Speedway European Championship

Qualification
Qualifying Round 1:
May 1, 2005
 Debrecen
Qualifying Round 2:
May 7, 2005
 Terenzano
Qualifying Round 3:
May 13, 2005
 Lviv
Semi-Final A:
July 2, 2005
 Stralsund
Semi-Final B:
July 2, 2005
 Miskolc
Scandinavian Final (Semi-Final C):
July 31, 2005
 Seinäjoki

Final
October 9, 2005
 Lonigo
Renat Gafurov has replace the injured Sergey Darkin.

See also

2005
European I